The University System of Georgia (USG) is the government agency that includes 26 public institutions of higher learning in the U.S. state of Georgia.  The system is governed by the Georgia Board of Regents.  It sets goals and dictates general policy to educational institutions as well as administering the Public Library Service of the state which includes 58 public library systems.  The USG also dispenses public funds (allocated by the state's legislature) to the institutions but not the lottery-funded HOPE Scholarship.  The USG is the sixth largest university system in the United States by total student enrollment, with 333,507 students in 26 public institutions.  USG institutions are divided into four categories: research universities, regional comprehensive universities, state universities, and state colleges.

The system designates four institutions as "research universities": Georgia Institute of Technology, University of Georgia, Augusta University, and Georgia State University. The University of Georgia is the state and system's flagship university, the state's oldest institution of higher learning, and one of the state's two land-grant universities. After its 2016 merger with Georgia Perimeter College, Georgia State University became the largest institution of higher learning in the USG, with over fifty thousand students. University of North Georgia is the state's designated military school. There are three historically black schools housed within the USG: Savannah State University, Albany State University, and the state's second land-grant university, Fort Valley State University.

In 2012, all USG institutions combined had a $14.1 billion economic impact on the state of Georgia. Georgia Tech in Atlanta and University of Georgia in nearby Athens had the largest impacts on their regional economies: $2.6 billion and 20,869 jobs at Georgia Tech and $2.2 billion and 22,196 jobs at the University of Georgia. Georgia State University's central campus in Atlanta had a $1.6 billion economic impact with 13,736 jobs; given its merger with Perimeter College, with an economic impact of $600 million, Georgia State's overall economic impact on the Atlanta metro area is $2.2 billion.

History

Early years 
The University System of Georgia was created with the passage of the Reorganization Act of 1931 by the Georgia General Assembly in 1931. The Reorganization Act created a Board of Regents to oversee the state's colleges and universities and the 26 boards of trustees that had provided oversight over the various institutions before passage of the act. The Board of Regents officially took office on January 1, 1932, and consisted of eleven members to be appointed by the Governor of Georgia pending approval from the Georgia Senate. The Governor held an ex officio position on the Board. The regents were to elect a chairman and select a secretary. One regent was appointed from each of Georgia's ten congressional districts and the eleventh member was chosen at large.

Governor Richard Russell Jr.'s initial appointees included Cason Jewell Callaway Sr., Martha Berry, Richard Russell Sr. (the governor's father), George C. Woodruff, William Dickson Anderson Sr. (1873–1957), Egbert Erle Cocke Sr. (1895–1977) and Philip Robert Weltner Sr. (1887–1981).  Anderson was elected chairman, Weltner vice-chairman and Cocke was appointed as the secretary/treasurer.  Prior to the Reorganization Act, Georgia university chief executives held the title of chancellor; however, after the Act, University heads were given the title of president and a new chancellor position was created. The USG chancellor was selected and overseen by the board. At the request of the regents, Charles Snelling, the presiding head of the University of Georgia (UGA), stepped down from his position at UGA to become the initial chancellor of the entire system.

The 1932 Annual Report for the Board stated outstanding debts of $1,074,415. Over the next few years the USG endeavored to transform the state's institutions of higher learning, reorganizing schools, merging and closing others and transforming course offerings and curriculum.

Modern history 
In 2011, Chancellor Hank Huckaby recommended four consolidations among eight institutions, which would be implemented in 2013. The same year, the Board of Regents adopted six "Principles for Consolidation", which has led to multiple consolidations in the subsequent years. As of 2018, these consolidations have decreased the number of USG colleges and universities from 35 to 26.

On April 1, 2022, former Georgia Governor and United States Secretary of Agriculture Sonny Perdue became the system's 14th Chancellor.

Additionally, the Skidaway Institute of Oceanography was aligned with the University of Georgia, which became effective July 1, 2013.

In Fall 2018, the university system saw enrollment reach an all-time high of 328,712 students enrolled across the system's 26 colleges and universities. On March 6, 2019, an Atlanta court upheld a USG policy barring unauthorized immigrants from attending Georgia State, Georgia Tech, and the University of Georgia. In regards to the COVID-19 pandemic in the United States, the USG decided against making wearing face coverings mandatory for the Fall 2020 semester before deciding to mandate them.

Georgia Research Alliance
The Georgia Research Alliance is an Atlanta, Georgia-based nonprofit organization that coordinates research efforts between Georgia's public and private sectors. While GRA receives a state appropriation for investment in university-based research opportunities, its operations are funded through foundation and industry contributions. In its first 19 years, GRA leveraged $525 million in state funding into $2.6 billion of additional federal and private investment.

In 2007, GRA coalesced the strengths of several universities into a focused research effort built around new types of vaccines and therapeutics.

GRA Eminent Scholars

GRA Eminent Scholars are top scientists from around the world recruited by the Georgia Research Alliance. For each scholar, GRA invests $750,000 for an endowment, an amount that the research university matches in private funds on a minimum 1-1 basis. Eminent Scholars often bring a research team, significant federal funding and private support for their research. Georgia's investment in GRA Eminent Scholars has yielded more than $1 billion in outside grants and contracts for the state and helped to launch some 35 companies.

GRA's Cancer Initiative

 
After 10 years as an independent nonprofit organization, the Georgia Cancer Coalition became an initiative of the Georgia Research Alliance on January 18, 2012. The move was part of a larger effort to align Georgia's economic development assets in a more effective way.

GRA VentureLab

The Georgia Research Alliance set out to help launch companies around Georgian university research results, GRA launched its lead commercialization program, VentureLab, in 2002.

GRA also works with established Georgia companies through the Georgia Department of Economic Development and the Georgia Centers of Innovation in aerospace, logistics, life sciences, energy, agriculture and advanced manufacturing.  The COIs help find technology solutions to industry challenges, in part by connecting companies to leading-edge research at Georgia's universities.

From 2002 to 2010, GRA directed $19 million of state funding into VentureLab. During that time, more than 700 university inventions or discoveries have been evaluated for commercial potential. More than 107 active companies have been formed, which employ more than 650 Georgians. These companies have also attracted $460 million in equity investment and generated $77 million in revenue.

GRA Centers of Research Excellence

Centers of Research Excellence are collaborative and individual efforts that focus on one area of scientific research.

List of institutions

USG designations 
USG classifies its institutions into four "functional sectors" based on each institution's specific mission and function:

 Research University: Doctoral-granting institutions classified by the Carnegie Classification as "very high" or "high" research activity (R1 and R2, respectively).
 Regional Comprehensive University: Institutions that offer undergraduate and master's-level degrees with some master's-dominant graduate programs.
 State University: Institutions that offer associate's, bachelor's, and master's degrees with limited, select doctoral programs.
 State College: Institutions that offer bachelor's and associate degrees with no graduate programs.

See also
 Student Advisory Council of Georgia – An organizational body composed of the student government presidents at each of the University System's institutions
 Technical College System of Georgia – A separate post-secondary education system which oversees Georgia's technical colleges
 List of colleges and universities in Georgia – A list of all colleges and universities in the state of Georgia

Notes

References

External links

 
 
G
1931 establishments in Georgia (U.S. state)
Educational institutions established in 1931